Dave Kikoski (born September 29, 1961) is an American jazz pianist and keyboardist.

Biography 
Born in New Brunswick, New Jersey, Kikoski learned piano from his father and played with him in bars as a teenager. He studied at the Berklee College of Music in the early 1980s, then moved to New York City in 1985, touring and recording subsequently with Roy Haynes (from 1986), Randy Brecker (1986–88), Bob Berg (1988), and Billy Hart (1989). He has also played or recorded with George Garzone, Barry Finnerty, Red Rodney, Craig Handy, Ralph Moore, Didier Lockwood, Joe Locke, Olivier Ker Ourio and Mingus Big Band. Kikoski won a 2011 Grammy Award with the Mingus Big Band for the Best Live Jazz Ensemble Album, "Live at the Jazz Standard".  He also had a Grammy nomination with Roy Haynes for the "Birds of a Feather" CD.

Kikoski has been a resident of Jersey City, New Jersey.

Discography

As leader

with BeatleJazz 
 A Bite of the Apple (Zebra, 1999)
 Another Bite of the Apple (Zebra, 2001)
 With a Little Help From Our Friends (Lightyear, 2005)
 All You Need is Love (Lightyear, 2007)

with Opus 5
 Introducing Opus 5 (Criss Cross, 2011)
 Pentasonic (Criss Cross, 2012)
 Progression (Criss Cross, 2013)

As sideman 
With Roy Haynes
 True or False (Evidence, 1986)
 When It's Haynes It Roars! (Dreyfus Jazz, 1992)
 Homecoming (Evidence, 1994)
 Te Vou! (Dreyfus Jazz, 1994)
 Praise (Dreyfus Jazz, 1998)
 Birds of a Feather: A Tribute to Charlie Parker (Dreyfus Jazz, 2001) – Grammy nominated
 Love Letters (Eighty-Eight's, 2002)

With Billy Hart
 Amethyst (Arabesque, 1993) 
 Oceans of Time (Arabesque, 1997)

With others
 Bob Berg, Another Standard (Stretch, 1997)
 Pe De Boi, Power Samba Band (Arkadia Jazz, 1998)
 Craig Handy, Introducing Three for All + One (Arabesque, 1993)
 Toninho Horta, From Ton To Tom (VideoArts Music, 1998)
 Dave Lisik, Bonnie and Clyde (SkyDeck Music, 2017)
 Ralph Moore, 623 C Street (Criss Cross, 1987)
 Pat Martino, Remember: A Tribute to Wes Montgomery (Blue Note, 2006) – rec. 2005
 Alexander Claffy, Standards: What Are You Doing The Rest Of Your Life? (SMK Jazz, 2018)

References 

Mark Gilbert, "Dave Kikoski". Grove Jazz online.
[ Discography] at Allmusic

External links 
 

American jazz pianists
American male pianists
People from Milltown, New Jersey
Musicians from Jersey City, New Jersey
Musicians from New Brunswick, New Jersey
1961 births
Living people
DIW Records artists
Criss Cross Jazz artists
20th-century American pianists
21st-century American pianists
20th-century American male musicians
21st-century American male musicians
American male jazz musicians
Mingus Big Band members
HighNote Records artists